Theodoros Koukoulakis (Greek: Θεόδωρος Κουκουλάκης, c. 1879 – 1909 ) was a Greek revolutionary and a minor leader of the Macedonian Struggle.

Biography
Koukoulakis was a member of a well-known Cretan family from Lakkoi, a village near Chania. Many members of his family took part in various revolutions of the 19th century as Greek War of Independence, Cretan revolt of 1866 etc. and others were officers of the Hellenic Army. Koukoulakis himself, was a volunteer during the Cretan Revolt of 1897.

In November 1904 he entered Macedonia as a member of his fellow Cretan officer Georgios Tsontos. Later, he became leader of a small band in Kastanochoria (el). His main activity is located in 1904/05 period. During early 1905, Koukoulakis and his men were between Drosopigi and Lechovo. The same period, according to Greek sources, his band made a successful ambush against komitadjis and after that Koukoulakis and his men avoid an operation that was held by the Ottoman Gendarmerie. In March 1905, Koukoulakis took part in the attack against the Bulgarian village of Zagoritsani ( today, Vasiliada). During the attack, he entered the village from the north side along with his fellow Cretan leader, Ioannis Poulakas.

Koukoulakis died in September 14, 1909 in Athens due to health problems that he suffered from his time in Macedonia.

References

People of the Macedonian Struggle
1909 deaths
People from Chania (regional unit)
Year of birth uncertain
1870s births
Military personnel from Crete
Greek people from the Ottoman Empire